Gilbert U (born 15 May 1945) is a Hong Kong sports shooter. He competed at the 1984 Summer Olympics, the 1988 Summer Olympics and the 1992 Summer Olympics.

References

External links
 

1945 births
Living people
Hong Kong male sport shooters
Olympic shooters of Hong Kong
Shooters at the 1984 Summer Olympics
Shooters at the 1988 Summer Olympics
Shooters at the 1992 Summer Olympics
Place of birth missing (living people)
Shooters at the 1982 Asian Games
Shooters at the 1986 Asian Games
Shooters at the 1990 Asian Games
Shooters at the 1994 Asian Games
Asian Games medalists in shooting
Asian Games bronze medalists for Hong Kong
Medalists at the 1986 Asian Games
Commonwealth Games medallists in shooting
Commonwealth Games bronze medallists for Hong Kong
Shooters at the 1986 Commonwealth Games
Shooters at the 1990 Commonwealth Games
Medallists at the 1986 Commonwealth Games
Medallists at the 1990 Commonwealth Games